New Taipei City Council is the city council of New Taipei City, Republic of China. It is now composed of 66 councillors, all recently elected on 24 November 2018 in the local elections. Along with the Kaohsiung City Council, the city council is the largest local council in terms of seats.

History 

The council was originally established Taipei County Council. On 25 December 2010, it was changed to New Taipei City Council.

Organization 
 Meeting Affairs Division
 General Affairs Division
 Legal Affairs Office
 Public Relations Office
 Information Management Office
 Administration Office
 Documentation Office
 Personnel Office
 Accounting Office

Transportation 
The council is accessible within walking distance South West from Jiangzicui Station of Taipei Metro.

See also 
 New Taipei City Government

References

External links